Jordan Riber is a Zimbabwean-born Tanzanian Film and Television Director, Screenwriter, Producer, Editor and Sound engineer.

Life and education
Riber was born to the family of son John and Louise Riber, both if whom are filmmakers, and was raised in Harare, Zimbabwe. Most of his time was spent in the film sets and postproduction facilities while growing up. He graduated in 2004 from Fairhaven College, Western Washington University, Bellingham, Washington, United States, where he studied Film [production]. Since 2005, he had been a practicing filmmaker and sound engineer in Dar es Salaam, Tanzania.

Career
In 2012, he directed and edited Siri ya Mtungi, a half-hour long Swahili language TV Series, starring Cathryn Credo, Beatrice Taisamo, Yvonne Cherrie and others. It was nominated for "Best Television Series - Comedy/drama", "Best Indigenous Language Movie/Series Swahili" and "Best Sound Editor" award categories at the 2014 Africa Magic Viewers Choice Awards (AMVCA) event.

In 2017, he directed the film, Hadithi za Kumekucha: Tunu.

In 2018, he directed, produced and edited his second feature film, Hadithi za Kumekucha: Fatuma, starring also starring Cathryn Credo, Beatrice Taisamo and Ayoub Bombwe. In the same year, he directed and produced Bahasha (The Envelope), a drama film, featuring Ayoub Bombwe, Godliver Gordian, Omary Mrisho and Cathryn Credo.

In the 2018 Zanzibar International Film Festival (ZIFF)'s official selection, Riber's Bahasha was the opening film for premiering, which together with Fatuma were placed in the "Long Features" category. At the awards, he got the Best Director and Best Cinematography awards, in the Swahili Movies special category.

Filmatography

Accolades

References

External links
 Jordan Riber on IMDb
 Jordan Riber on Mubi
 Jordan Riber on SPLA
 Jordan Riber on Staffmeup
 Jordan Riber on KweliTV
 Jordan Riber on Letterboxd
 Jordan Riber on Coursicle

Living people
White Zimbabwean people
Zimbabwean filmmakers
Tanzanian film directors
Western Washington University alumni
Swahili-language writers
Year of birth missing (living people)